Sanctorum may refer to:

 Sanctum sanctorum, a Latin phrase that literally means "Holy of Holies"
 Sortes Sanctorum (Lots of the saints) or Sortes Sacrae (Holy Lots), a type of divination or cleromancy practiced in early Christianity
 In Splendoribus Sanctorum, the communion chant for the propers of Christmas midnight mass, sung during the distribution of holy communion
 Acta Sanctorum ("Acts of the Saints"), an encyclopedic text in 68 folio volumes of documents examining the lives of Christian saints, in essence a critical hagiography
 Acta Sanctorum Hiberniae, the abbreviated title of a celebrated work on the Irish saints by the Franciscan, John Colgan (Leuven, 1645)
 Passio sanctorum Petri et Pauli, a late version of the martyrdoms of the two apostles, which claims to have been written by a certain Marcellus, thus the anonymous author, of whom nothing further is known, is referred to as the "pseudo-Marcellus"
 The Golden Legend or Legenda Sanctorum by Jacopo da Varagine, a collection of fanciful hagiographies or lives of the saints that became a late medieval bestseller

Entertainment
 Beyond Sanctorum, the second studio album by Swedish band Therion
 Sanctum Sanctorum (Marvel Comics), a fictional building in the Marvel Universe